"Eyes on Me" is the eleventh single by Japanese recording artist Superfly, released on December 15, 2010. The single was released as a standard CD release and a limited edition CD+DVD bundle. "Rescue Me" and "Prima Donna" serve as the single's B-sides. The DVD included with the first pressings of the single features an "Official Bootleg Live DVD" of Superfly's performance at the Monster Bash 2010 music festival on August 23, 2010. "Eyes on Me" has since been nominated for the 2011 Space Shower Music Video Award for best female video.

Track listing

Personnel

Personnel details were sourced from the liner notes booklet of Mind Travel.

Tomoyuki Asakawa – harp
Gen Ittetsu Strings – strings
Hideki Matsubara – bass 
Shiho Ochi – lead and background vocals, glockenspiel, vibraphone, wind chime
Satoshi Shōji – oboe
Hideyo Takakuwa – flute 
Yuichi Togashiki – drums
Kōichi Tsutaya – piano
Yoshiyuki Yatsuhashi – acoustic guitar, electric guitar

Chart rankings

Reported sales and certifications

References

External links
Eyes On Me at Superfly's official website 

2010 singles
2010 songs
Japanese-language songs
Superfly (band) songs
Video game theme songs
Warner Music Japan singles